Wynnum Central railway station is located on the Cleveland line in Queensland, Australia. It is one of three stations serving the Brisbane suburb of Wynnum, the other two being Wynnum and Wynnum North.
Wynnum Central was opened in 1898

History
Wynnum Central was originally just a stopping place at the level crossing called Craig's Crossing beginning in April 1898. Later that year was a station was opened named Wynnum South.

It was renamed Wynnum Central in 1932 after a proposal by the Wynnum-Manly-Lota Chamber of Commerce in 1931.

Services
Wynnum Central is served by Cleveland line services from Shorncliffe, Northgate, Doomben and Bowen Hills to Manly & Cleveland.

Services by platform

References

External links

Wynnum Central station Queensland's Railways on the Internet
[ Wynnum Central station] TransLink travel information

Railway stations in Brisbane
Railway stations in Australia opened in 1898
Wynnum, Queensland